L. B. Harvey was an American football coach. He served as the third head football coach at Mississippi A&M (now known as Mississippi State University) for the 1901 season. Harvey was brought over from Georgetown College to serve as player-coach for the 1901 squad. During his one-season tenure, Harvey compiled an overall record of two wins, two losses and one tie (2–2–1). One of his two victories was the first against rival Ole Miss in what was later dubbed the Egg Bowl in their first all-time meeting.

Head coaching record

References

Year of birth missing
Year of death missing
Georgetown Tigers football players
Mississippi State Bulldogs football coaches
Mississippi State Bulldogs football players